UFC 244: Masvidal vs. Diaz was a mixed martial arts pay-per-view event produced by the Ultimate Fighting Championship that took place on November 2, 2019 at Madison Square Garden in New York City, New York, United States. It was the UFC's 500th live event. United States President Donald Trump was among the attendees for the event.

Background

Card changes and main event jeopardy
A welterweight bout between Jorge Masvidal and former UFC Lightweight Championship challenger and The Ultimate Fighter 5 lightweight winner Nate Diaz headlined the event. After his UFC 241 win against former lightweight champion Anthony Pettis, Diaz proclaimed himself the "baddest motherfucker in the game" and issued a challenge to Masvidal. When the fight was scheduled, Dana White announced that a celebratory "baddest motherfucker" belt, embossed "BMF," would be awarded to the winner. However, on October 24, Diaz tweeted a statement saying he would not be competing due to an adverse drug test finding, which put the bout in jeopardy. On October 26, the UFC announced that Diaz had been cleared to compete, as his positive test had traces of LGD-4033, or Ligandrol, a selective androgen receptor modulator which was known to be linked to a tainted batch of organic, vegan multivitamins.

Krzysztof Jotko was scheduled to face Edmen Shahbazyan at the event. However, Jotko was removed from the card in early October for undisclosed reasons and replaced by Brad Tavares.

Weigh-ins
At the weigh-ins, former Invicta FC Flyweight Champion Jennifer Maia weighed in at 127.2 pounds, 1.2 pounds over the flyweight non-title fight limit of 126 pounds. The bout proceeded at a catchweight and Maia was fined 25% of her purse, which went to her opponent Katlyn Chookagian.

Prior to the ceremonial weigh-ins, the New York State Athletic Commission (NYSAC) issued a rare statement in which it was announced that they would be pursuing disciplinary action against The Ultimate Fighter: Team Jones vs. Team Sonnen middleweight winner and former interim title challenger Kelvin Gastelum. In the statement, the Athletic Commission stated that following a review of Gastelum's weigh-in video they "determined that Mr. Gastelum made contact with another person while on the scale, a violation of the weigh in policy. In light of this violation, the Commission will pursue disciplinary action. At this time, the official weight determination will not be disturbed, and Mr. Gastelum will not be disqualified from competing in UFC 244."

Fines
On November 8, it was announced that Corey Anderson had been fined $10,000 by the NYSAC for "unsportsmanlike and disorderly conduct" for taunting and screaming at Johnny Walker and shoving the referee away during his post-fight celebration. Kelvin Gastelum was also fined $1,000 for making physical contact with his coach Rafael Cordeiro while on the scale at the weigh-ins.

Event
The event consisted of twelve mixed martial arts bouts sanctioned by the NYSAC and contested under the unified rules of mixed martial arts. The first eleven bouts were scheduled for three five-minute rounds and the main event between Masvidal and Diaz was scheduled for five five-minute rounds. Five main card bouts were televised live on ESPN+ pay-per-view. Four preliminary bouts were televised live on ESPN2 and three were streamed live on UFC Fight Pass and ESPN+. UFC 244 set the second best mixed martial arts gate record in New York. The event earned $6,575,996.19 in ticket sales, behind the previous record set at UFC 205.

Early Preliminary card
In the first bout at the event, Hakeem Dawodu outpointed Julio Arce at featherweight to win via split decision, 29–28 on two judges scorecards.

The second match up saw Lyman Good defeat Chance Rencountre via technical knockout (TKO) in the third round.

Next, in a women's flyweight bout, Katlyn Chookagian defeated Jennifer Maia via unanimous decision; the score was 29–28 on all three judges scorecards.

Preliminary card
The prelims began at 8 p.m. Eastern Time Zone and four bouts were broadcast on ESPN2. All four bouts ended in round one via TKOs or knockouts (KOs), except one finished in round three.

The first fight on the preliminary card was between Jairzinho Rozenstruik and former UFC Heavyweight Champion Andrei Arlovski. Rozenstruik defeated Arlovski via KO, just 29 seconds into the first round.

The next fight was a middleweight bout between Edmen Shahbazyan and Brad Tavares. Shahbazyan won via head kick KO in the first round.

The penultimate preliminary bout saw Shane Burgos defeat Makwan Amirkhani via TKO due to punches in the third round.

In the preliminary card's final match, a light heavyweight contest between Corey Anderson and Johnny Walker, Anderson beat Walker via TKO in round one. After the fight, Dana White criticized Walker for his in-fight behavior.

Main card
The first bout on the pay-per-view portion of the event saw former interim title challenger Kevin Lee take on the undefeated Gregor Gillespie in a lightweight contest. Lee defeated Gillespie via head kick KO in the first round. This win earned him the Performance of the Night bonus.

Derrick Lewis defeated Blagoy Ivanov by via split decision, winning 30–27 and 29–28 on two judges scorecards.

Stephen Thompson defeated Vicente Luque via unanimous decision. This fight earned them the Fight of the Night bonus.

Darren Till returned to the middleweight division, defeating Kelvin Gastelum via split decision. Till won 29–28 and 30–27 on two judges scorecards.

Main event
The final bout of the main card, a welterweight match between Jorge Masvidal and former UFC Lightweight Championship challenger Nate Diaz, was for the symbolic "BMF" belt. Masvidal was awarded the TKO victory when the cageside doctor, Nitin K. Sethi, ruled that Diaz was unable to continue between the third and fourth rounds.

Results

Bonus awards
The following fighters received $50,000 bonuses.
Fight of the Night: Stephen Thompson vs. Vicente Luque
Performance of the Night: Kevin Lee and Corey Anderson

See also 

 List of UFC events
 2019 in UFC
 List of current UFC fighters
 Mixed martial arts in New York

References 

Ultimate Fighting Championship events
Sporting events in New York City
Madison Square Garden
Mixed martial arts in New York (state)
Sports in Manhattan
2019 in sports in New York (state)
2019 in sports in New York City
2019 in mixed martial arts